Nikolai Alekseevich Voznesensky (– 1 October 1950) was a Soviet politician and economic planner who oversaw the running of Gosplan (State Planning Committee) during the German-Soviet War. A protégé of Andrei Zhdanov, Voznesensky was appointed Deputy Premier in May 1940. He was directly involved in the recovery of production associated with the movement of industry eastwards at the start of the war. His work The Economy of the USSR during World War II is his account of these years.

Following the war, Voznesensky was persecuted during the Leningrad affair. In a secret trial, he was found guilty of treason, sentenced to death and executed the same day. He was rehabilitated in 1954.

He was a close associate of Alexei Kosygin and Mikhail Rodionov.

Biography

Early life 
Nikolai Voznesensky was born in Tula in the family of a clerk of a forestry office. He was the younger brother of Alexander Voznesensky. 

Voznesensky joined the Komsomol in 1919 and quickly rose through its ranks becoming the editor in chief of the Kommunar newspaper which was the official organ of the Tula Komsomol District in 1925.

After graduating from the Sverdlov Communist University he was sent to study at the economic faculty of the Institute of Red Professors in 1928 and later himself became a professor of the institute from 1931. In 1935 he was awarded the academic degree of Doctor of Economics.

Rise to power and World War II 
Voznesensky was quickly rising through the ranks of the party with the help of his mentor Andrei Zhdanov. In 1934 he became a member of the Central Control Commission and was the representative of the party control commission in Donetsk. 

From 1935 to 1937 he was the head of the Leningrad Control Commission and in November 1937 he was appointed deputy head of the State Planning Committee (Gosplan), which he was then appointed Chairman in 1938. In 1941 he was elected as a candidate member of the Politburo of the VKP (b), and he received the newly created post of Deputy Chairman of the Council of People's Commissars, making him of the most powerful men in the Soviet Union at the age of thirty eight. 

During the German-Soviet War he was a member of the State Defense Committee and a member of the Committee under the Council of People's Commissars of the USSR for the restoration of the economy in the liberated territories.

Post World War II and Leningrad Affair 
From February 28, 1947 to March 1, 1949 he was a full member of the Politburo of the All-Union Communist Party (b). Voznesensky was one of the people in charge of the reconstruction of the Soviet economy after the war and was also a member of the commission of the Soviet Union's nuclear project.

After the death of Andrei Zhdanov, Voznesensky disappeared from public life for a period of time. In connection with the Leningrad Affair, on March 7, 1949, he was removed from the post of deputy chairman of the Council of Ministers of the USSR and removed from the Politburo of the Central Committee. From a resolution adopted by the Central Committee, Voznesensky was accused of being purposefully responsible for "..the disappearance of secret documents in the USSR State Planning Committee". He was arrested on October 27, 1949, and was sentenced to death on the night of September 30, 1950. He is believed to have been shot shortly after the verdict was announced. 

Voznesensky was rehabilitated by the Military Collegium of the Supreme Court of the Soviet Union on April 30, 1954 and his membership was reinstated in the Communist Party of the Soviet Union.

Honours and awards
 Two Orders of Lenin
 Stalin Prize - 1947

References

External links
 

1903 births
1950 deaths
People from Chernsky District
People from Chernsky Uyezd
Politburo of the Central Committee of the Communist Party of the Soviet Union members
People's commissars and ministers of the Soviet Union
Second convocation members of the Soviet of Nationalities
Members of the Supreme Soviet of the Russian Soviet Federative Socialist Republic, 1938–1947
Members of the Supreme Soviet of the Russian Soviet Federative Socialist Republic, 1947–1951
Members of the Supreme Soviet of the Karelo-Finnish Soviet Socialist Republic
Second convocation members of the Verkhovna Rada of the Ukrainian Soviet Socialist Republic
Soviet economists
Institute of Red Professors alumni
Full Members of the USSR Academy of Sciences
Stalin Prize winners
Recipients of the Order of Lenin
Leningrad affair
People executed for treason against the Soviet Union
People executed for corruption
Members of the Communist Party of the Soviet Union executed by the Soviet Union
Russian people executed by the Soviet Union
People from Tula Oblast
Executed Soviet people from Russia
Soviet rehabilitations